Fung Mei Wai, formerly Kau Shi Wai (literally dog shit walled (village)), is a village in Fung Yuen, Tai Po, Hong Kong.

Administration
Fung Mei Wai is one of the villages represented within the Tai Po Rural Committee. For electoral purposes, Fung Mei Wai is part of the Hong Lok Yuen constituency, which was formerly represented by Zero Yiu Yeuk-sang until May 2021.

Name change
In 2013, the Lands Department's Geographical Place Names Board recommended changing the name of the village. 
The proposal followed a letter from a Tai Po Fung Yuen village representative, who complained that Kau Shi Wai was indecent and could cause embarrassment.

The Tai Po District Council voted in favour of the name change by 10 votes to 0, with 5 abstentions. The new name, Fung Mei Wai, was officially adopted in January 2014.
Signposts and the Lands Department's GeoInfo Map were subsequently updated to reflect the change.

See also
 Shitterton

References

Villages in Tai Po District, Hong Kong